Nordstromia fuscula is a moth in the family Drepanidae. It was described by Hong-Fu Chu and Lin-Yao Wang in 1988. It is found in the Chinese provinces of Sichuan and Fujian.

Adults resemble Nordstromia fusca, but can be distinguished by the wing pattern and the male genitalia.

References

Moths described in 1988
Drepaninae
Moths of Asia